Southwellina is a genus of parasitic worms belonging to the family Polymorphidae.

The species of this genus are found in Northern America and India.

Species:

Southwellina hispida 
Southwellina macracanthus 
Southwellina sacra

References

Polymorphidae
Acanthocephala genera